Ginger Helgeson (born September 14, 1968) is a former American professional tennis player, who is considered to be perhaps the greatest player ever to come out of Minnesota. She reached her highest singles ranking on January 2, 1995, when she became the No. 29 in the world. In doubles, she reached No. 38 in the same year, on January 9.

Tennis career
Helgeson-Nielsen was born in St. Cloud, Minnesota, before moving to Edina after seventh grade. She was coached by her brother, Brace, throughout juniors and high school. She attended Edina High School and became a three-time consecutive Minnesota state singles champion, and was ranked No. 1 by the USTA Northern at all levels.

Helgeson-Nielsen then received a scholarship to attend Pepperdine University in Malibu, California. Whilst there, she was a four-year letter winner and a three-time All American, and holds the all-time best career winning percentage.

She played professionally from 1987, spending her first few years on the ITF Women's Circuit. Her best season was in 1994, winning her first WTA title in Auckland and reaching the fourth round of the Australian and U.S. Opens. At the latter event, she beat reigning Wimbledon champion Conchita Martínez for her biggest career victory. Her ranking hit the top 30 as a result of her breakthrough season. She reached the final of Auckland again in 1995, but a serious wrist injury at a tournament in Amelia Island put her out for the rest of the 1995 season. She returned in March 1996, but wasn't able to make it back into the top 100 in singles. She played her last match at the US Open qualifying tournament in 1998, where she reached the second round.

In addition to her win over Martínez, she also recorded victories over Helena Suková, Mary Joe Fernández, Gigi Fernández, Anke Huber, Lori McNeil, Sabine Appelmans, Sabine Hack and Natasha Zvereva.

In 2009, she was inducted into the USTA Northern Hall of Fame, having already been inducted into the Pepperdine Athletic Hall of Fame in 2008. Helgeson-Nielsen now lives in Alpine, California, with her two boys. She runs her own professional tennis instruction business.

WTA career finals

Singles: 1 title, 1 runner-up

Doubles: 2 runner-ups

Best Grand Slam results details

References

External links
 
 

1968 births
American female tennis players
American people of Danish descent
People from Edina, Minnesota
People from Alpine, California
Sportspeople from St. Cloud, Minnesota
Pepperdine Waves women's tennis players
Tennis people from California
Tennis people from Minnesota
Living people
Edina High School alumni